
The Ball-Bartoe Aircraft Corporation was a US aerodynamics research firm and aircraft manufacturer established as a joint venture between Ball Corp and aerodynamicist Otto Bartoe in Boulder, Colorado in 1973. The firm conducted research into blown wings as a means of increasing aircraft lift at low airspeeds and constructed a research aircraft, the Ball-Bartoe Jetwing, as a testbed for these studies. The firm was dissolved in 1978.

References
 
 aerofiles.com
 Ball Corporation website

Companies based in Boulder, Colorado
Defunct companies based in Colorado
Defunct aircraft manufacturers of the United States
Technology companies established in 1973
Technology companies disestablished in 1978
1973 establishments in Colorado
1978 disestablishments in Colorado